B. Ramamurthy is an Indian director primarily concentrating on Kannada and Tamil feature films. He wrote and directed numerous blockbuster films. He is known for giving chances to youngsters who have made names in Kannada Film Industry and beyond. He is known to have an exceptional eye for talent, a trait acknowledged by his well established disciples. He is considered one of the most revered directors of Kannada film industry sandalwood.

Selected filmography

References

Year of birth missing (living people)
20th-century Indian film directors
Kannada male actors
Living people
Kannada film directors